Ahanta is a Central Tano language, spoken along the southwest coast of Ghana between the cities of Takoradi and Princes Town, Ghana.

References

Central Tano languages
Languages of Ghana